"Power Broker" is the third episode of the American television miniseries The Falcon and the Winter Soldier, based on Marvel Comics featuring the characters Sam Wilson / Falcon and Bucky Barnes / Winter Soldier. It follows the pair as they reluctantly work with Helmut Zemo to learn more about the creation of a new super-soldier serum. The episode is set in the Marvel Cinematic Universe (MCU), sharing continuity with the films of the franchise. It was written by Derek Kolstad and directed by Kari Skogland.

Sebastian Stan and Anthony Mackie reprise their respective roles as Bucky Barnes and Sam Wilson from the film series, with Emily VanCamp, Wyatt Russell, Erin Kellyman, Florence Kasumba, Danny Ramirez, Adepero Oduye, and Daniel Brühl (Zemo) also starring. Development began by October 2018, and Skogland joined in May 2019. Kolstad was hired that July. The episode visits the fictional country of Madripoor, a comic book location that was previously controlled by 20th Century Fox and could not be introduced to the MCU until the acquisition of 21st Century Fox by Disney. Filming took place at Pinewood Atlanta Studios in Atlanta, Georgia, with location filming in the Atlanta metropolitan area and in Prague.

"Power Broker" was released on the streaming service Disney+ on April 2, 2021. Critics were more mixed on the episode than previous ones, criticizing its multiple story elements and use of existing tropes, but many praised Brühl's performance. A brief moment of Zemo dancing spawned various internet memes and led to the release of additional footage.

Plot
Bucky Barnes and Sam Wilson travel to Berlin to talk to an imprisoned Helmut Zemo about the emergence of a terrorist group of Super Soldiers, the Flag Smashers. Behind Wilson's back, Barnes orchestrates a prison riot to help Zemo escape after the latter agrees to help the pair. Barnes, Zemo, and Wilson travel to Madripoor, a criminal sanctuary city-state run by the mysterious Power Broker. Zemo asks Barnes to act as the Winter Soldier while Wilson poses as a gangster who frequents Madripoor.

After Zemo uses Barnes to get the attention of high-ranking criminal Selby, the group meet with her and reveals that Hydra scientist Dr. Wilfred Nagel was hired by the Power Broker to recreate the Super Soldier Serum. Wilson's identity is exposed after his sister Sarah calls him in the middle of their meeting. In the ensuing firefight, Selby is killed and all of the bounty hunters in the city target the group. Sharon Carter, who has been living as a fugitive since the Sokovia Accords conflict, saves them from the bounty hunters.

Carter uses her connections in Madripoor to find Nagel's lab and takes Wilson, Barnes, and Zemo there. Nagel explains that he recreated twenty doses of the serum and they were stolen by the Flag Smashers' leader Karli Morgenthau. Zemo unexpectedly kills Nagel, and the lab is destroyed when bounty hunters attack. Zemo finds a getaway vehicle, but Carter decides to stay behind in Madripoor and Wilson agrees to obtain a pardon for her so she can return to the U.S. Meanwhile, John Walker and Lemar Hoskins arrive in Berlin and deduce that Barnes and Wilson helped Zemo escape. The Flag Smashers raid a Global Repatriation Council (GRC) storage facility in Lithuania for supplies, and Morgenthau blows up the building with personnel inside to send a message.

Zemo, Barnes, and Wilson travel to Latvia in search of Morgenthau. Recognizing Wakandan tracking devices in the street, Barnes breaks off and confronts Ayo of the Dora Milaje, who demands that Barnes hand Zemo to her.

Production

Development 
By October 2018, Marvel Studios was developing a limited series starring Anthony Mackie's Sam Wilson / Falcon and Sebastian Stan's Bucky Barnes / Winter Soldier from the Marvel Cinematic Universe (MCU) films. Malcolm Spellman was hired as head writer of the series, which was announced as The Falcon and the Winter Soldier in April 2019. Spellman modeled the series after buddy films that deal with race, such as 48 Hrs. (1982), The Defiant Ones (1958), Lethal Weapon (1987), and Rush Hour (1998). Kari Skogland was hired to direct the miniseries a month later, and executive produced alongside Spellman and Marvel Studios' Kevin Feige, Louis D'Esposito, Victoria Alonso, and Nate Moore. Derek Kolstad joined the writing team in July 2019, and revealed in March 2021 that he had written the third episode, which is titled "Power Broker".

Writing 
The episode visits the fictional country of Madripoor, which is one of the first X-Men-centric elements previously controlled by 20th Century Fox to be introduced to the MCU following the acquisition of 21st Century Fox by Disney. The Princess Bar, which is frequented by Wolverine in the comics, is referenced with a neon sign, while the Brass Monkey Saloon appears. In the latter, Wilson, Barnes, and Helmut Zemo meet a character named Selby, which is the name of a mutant from the comics that understands binary code. Spellman said the writers "geeked out" at being able to use Madripoor in the series, while co-executive producer Zoie Nagelhout felt it was incredible to introduce the country to the MCU and expand that world. Nagelhout said Madripoor was used to make Wilson and Barnes feel like "fish out of water", and also as a place to reintroduce Sharon Carter to the MCU.

"Power Broker" also features Ayo, a member of the Dora Milaje from Wakanda. Matt Patches of Polygon felt including Ayo was satisfying for audiences and was a way to connect Wakanda to the series with "thematic resonance" beyond simply pulling from the MCU's lore because of Barnes' history with the nation, and because The Falcon and the Winter Soldier was dealing with racial issues in America and global class warfare which are themes that were addressed in Black Panther (2018).

Casting 
The episode stars Sebastian Stan as Bucky Barnes, Anthony Mackie as Sam Wilson, Emily VanCamp as Sharon Carter, Wyatt Russell as John Walker / Captain America, Erin Kellyman as Karli Morgenthau, Florence Kasumba as Ayo, Danny Ramirez as Joaquin Torres, Adepero Oduye as Sarah Wilson, and Daniel Brühl as Helmut Zemo. Also appearing are Clé Bennett as Lemar Hoskins / Battlestar, Desmond Chiam, Dani Deetté, and Indya Bussey as the Flag Smashers Dovich, Gigi, and DeeDee, respectively, Renes Rivera as Lennox, Tyler Dean Flores as Diego, Noah Mills as Nico, Veronica Falcón as Donya Madani, Neal Kodinsky as Rudy, Nicholas Pryor as Oeznik, Imelda Corcoran as Selby, and Olli Haaskivi as Wilfred Nagel. Haaskivi originally auditioned for a character simply called "Doctor", and did not find out his actual role until a few days before filming. He researched the comics once he knew the name, but did not find much information on the character and felt he was able to create his own interpretation instead.

Design 
Production designer Ray Chan built the sets for Madripoor at Pinewood Atlanta Studios in Atlanta, Georgia, as the production team originally planned to film Madripoor scenes in southeastern Asian countries such as Myanmar, Thailand, and Vietnam, but could not due to scheduling difficulties. Skogland wanted to create a signature look for Madripoor, something that she hoped would be "exotic and a bit familiar but off-grid; to have a real street feel but be quite colorful and eye-popping". Many different real-world locations were used as inspiration for the fictional country. The Madripoor location had influences from Asian style and culture, and was divided into two regions, Hightown and Lowtown. Chan and art director Jennifer Bash researched Vietnam and was inspired by the "almost claustrophobic space" people lived in. Costume designer Michael Crow had also added that the "general idea was to create something that didn't have a specific time or a specific place to it". When choosing the color palette of the location, Crow had used green, brown, gray, and darker shades of blue and purple in order to give it a "greasy grimy feel" and an "oil slick kind of vibe to it", and had mainly implemented this color palette for Lowtown, but was also used for Hightown. The team also researched real-world gangs, mafias, and criminal groups located around the world and incorporated that into the design. While designing Hightown, Crow wanted to maintain the "oil slick vibe" but also wanted it to represent the richer class of the residents. He wanted to "elevate" the fashion, but wanted to "make it feel a little seedy and have a little bit of a dark undertone". Chan built steel bridges and commissioned many custom neon signs and over 80 light boxes for the set. As for the Brass Monkey bar, Skogland described it as being like a street bar that had a sense of it "emerging out of the bricks" from the starting bridge location. The Brass Monkey Saloon contained a 270 degree aquarium with 100 Orange goldfish, while a Los Angeles graffiti artist, Jake, decorated the wall with a "unique style of gangster art".

Filming and visual effects 
Filming took place at Pinewood Atlanta Studios in Atlanta, with Skogland directing, and P.J. Dillon serving as cinematographer. Location filming took place in the Atlanta metropolitan area and in Prague.

A brief moment of Zemo dancing and fist pumping in the episode spawned various internet memes after its release. This was improvised during filming by Brühl, who felt that since Zemo had been in prison for years he needed to "let off some steam and show his moves". He thought it would be cut from the final episode. Approximately 30 seconds of footage existed of Brühl dancing, more than what was included in the episode, and Marvel released the full sequence on social media on April 8, 2021, along with a looping hour-long version. Disney's president of marketing, Asad Ayaz, said his team was aware of fan reactions and trends on social media, and when they saw that Zemo dancing was a trending topic they worked quickly to release all of the available footage. Ayaz felt this was "not traditional marketing and advertising, but... a sensation" that "just took off".

Visual effects for the episode were created by Crafty Apes, Rodeo FX, Digital Frontier FX, QPPE, Stereo D, Tippett Studio, and Cantina Creative.

Music 
Selections from composer Henry Jackman's score for the episode were included in the series' Vol. 1 soundtrack album, which was released digitally by Marvel Music and Hollywood Records on April 9, 2021.

Marketing 
On March 19, 2021, Marvel announced a series of posters that were created by various artists to correspond with the episodes of the series. The posters were released weekly ahead of each episode, with the third poster, designed by Bella Grace, being revealed on March 21. After the episode's release, Marvel announced merchandise inspired by the episode, centered on Sharon Carter and Zemo, as part of its weekly "Marvel Must Haves" promotion for each episode of the series, including apparel and Funko Pops, as well as a Marvel Legends figure of Zemo, and Sharon Carter posters. Marvel also created a viral marketing tourism site for Madripoor, featuring Easter eggs such as wanted posters, clips of CCTV footage showing different angles of the episode's action scenes, and downloadable phone and computer wallpapers. The Buccaneer Bay and Hightown Nightclub areas of the site had hidden content, with the Buccaneer Bay area listing ships with the names of X-Men characters such as Mystique, Daken, and Krakoa, as well as Shang-Chi; these names were later removed from the site.

Release 
"Power Broker" was released on the streaming service Disney+ on April 2, 2021. In March 2022, an alternate cut of the episode with certain scenes edited, censoring and removing some instances of blood, was accidentally published on the platform in place of the original version. This was done in an attempt to correct a credit in the episode, and Disney said the original version would be restored.

Reception

Audience viewership 
Nielsen Media Research, who measure the number of minutes watched by United States audiences on television sets, listed The Falcon and the Winter Soldier as the second most-watched original series across streaming services for the week of March 29 to April 4, 2021. Between the first three episodes, which were available at the time, the series had 628 million minutes viewed, which was identical to the previous week.

Critical response 
The review aggregator website Rotten Tomatoes reported an 86% approval rating with an average score of 6.9/10 based on 36 reviews. The site's critical consensus reads, "Falcon and the Winter Soldier is still spreading its wings when it should be soaring during this transitionary installment, but 'Power Broker' is still a lot of fun thanks to the return of Daniel Brühl and Emily VanCamp to the MCU."

Sulagna Misra at The A.V. Club was critical of the episode, giving it a "C" grade, saying it "seems to be about gathering intel on the super-soldier serum and the Flag-Smashers, and even expanding Sam and Bucky's universe of associates. But it seems most interested in playing into action movie tropes more than anything else", and Misra felt it failed at that, elaborating, "The whole episode, I was just thinking of the times I've seen better versions of each of these scenes." She was also critical of the episode's characterizations, especially Sharon's which she described as a "failure of writing". Alan Sepinwall of Rolling Stone said the episode was "mostly just competent and not much more. We know Marvel Studios is capable of doing much better." Sepinwall compared the episode's action to Marvel Television's Agents of S.H.I.E.L.D. since it felt "pretty utilitarian" and was "cobbled together from ideas that have been done to death elsewhere, in the hopes that the mere presence of familiar (or, in some cases, semi-familiar) faces from the MCU will make it seem brand new and thrilling". He did enjoy Brühl's performance as Zemo. Writing for Entertainment Weekly, Chancellor Agard was ambivalent on the episode, saying it moved the story forward but was not satisfying enough on its own, and indicated that the show's creators were trying to stretch a two-hour film across six episodes. Agard did find that the introduction of Zemo helped to complicate the Wilson/Barnes dynamic while avoiding hitting the same beats as the previous episode, and he enjoyed Zemo's assessment of Trouble Man along with Ayo's appearance. He had a "cold and unsatisfied" feeling with the Nagel scene, even though he felt the exposition was necessary, and ultimately gave the episode a "B−". His colleague Christian Holub added, "The Falcon and the Winter Soldier is definitely playing with some interesting ideas, but I don't yet have the sense that the show knows exactly what it wants to do or say with them", feeling a bit confused by the various story elements but intrigued by what their conclusions would be.

Matt Purslow of IGN was more positive on the episode, calling it a "chunky chapter that efficiently unpacks many of the story's main plot threads" while also not sacrificing character development. He praised Brühl's performance, noting that his line delivery came with "a small smile and a dash of dry humor", and pointed out the similarities in the episode to the John Wick films which were created by this episode's writer Kolstad. Purslow concluded that after three episodes the series was "firing on all cylinders", and gave "Power Broker" a 9 out of 10. Den of Geeks Gavin Jasper gave it 4.5 out of 5 stars and felt it was a "breath of fresh air" and a true sequel to Captain America: Civil War (2016) since it was "a new spin on the same general concept". Jasper said Brühl's performance made Zemo "incredibly likeable and charismatic", likening it to Loki's role in Thor: The Dark World (2013), and was hopeful Marvel was planting the seeds to eventually introduce the Thunderbolts team from the comics to the MCU. Jasper did criticize the origins of the Flag Smashers, since it felt like "the status quo is the status quo and the MCU refuses to be changed too much by the developments of The Falcon and the Winter Soldier".

Notes

References

External links 
 
 Episode recap at Marvel.com
 Explore Madripoor viral marketing website

2021 American television episodes
The Falcon and the Winter Soldier episodes
Television episodes set in Riga
Television episodes set in Asia
Television episodes set in Berlin
Television episodes set in Germany
Television episodes set in prisons
Television episodes set on fictional islands
Television episodes written by Derek Kolstad
Vilnius in fiction
Television episodes set in the 2020s